Andrew Buckley (born 2 July 1973) is a retired field hockey player from New Zealand, who was a regular member of the men's national team, nicknamed The Black Sticks, during the late 1990s and early 2000s. Buckley earned a total number of 76 caps during his career.

References
NZ commonwealthgames
NZ caps

1973 births
Living people
New Zealand male field hockey players
Field hockey players at the 1998 Commonwealth Games
Commonwealth Games competitors for New Zealand